Sergio Canamasas Español (born 30 April 1986) is a former racing driver from Spain.

Career

Formula Three
Canamasas made his Formula racing debut in 2007, racing in the Spanish Formula Three Championship for the Cetea Sport team. He took part in the final eight races of the season and was entered into the secondary Copa de España class for the older Dallara F300 chassis. He took a single class podium in the final round in Barcelona to finish eighth in the standings. The following season, Canamasas moved up to the main class with the team, but failed to score a point in the fourteen races he contested.

For 2009, he continued in the series when it became known as the European F3 Open Championship, moving to the Emiliodevillota.com team. He finished the season in sixth place overall after taking podium places at Jarama, Jerez and Barcelona.

Formula Renault 3.5 Series

In March 2010, Canamasas took part in all three Formula Renault 3.5 Series pre-season tests at Barcelona, Jerez and Motorland Aragón, driving for Fortec Motorsport, ISR Racing and SG Formula. A week before the start of the season, he was confirmed at the new FHV Interwetten.com team, racing alongside 2009 European F3 Open champion Bruno Méndez. He failed to score a point in the 16 races he competed in, the only full-time driver who failed to do so. His best race result was a 14th-place finish in the second Magny–Cours race.

After testing for various teams during the off-season, Canamasas drove for new team BVM-Target in the 2011 season, racing alongside fellow second-year driver Daniel Zampieri. He finished eighth in the drivers' championship with a best finish of third at the Hungaroring, and also taking a pole position for the second race at the circuit.

GP2 Series
Canamasas began 2012 without a drive, but was signed by the Lazarus team to compete in the eighth round of the GP2 Series, alongside Giancarlo Serenelli and replacing Fabrizio Crestani. He did not score any points from the ten races in which he competed. In 2014, Canamasas switched to Trident and took his first podium in GP2 by finishing third in the sprint race at Monaco. Canamasas was disqualified from the sprint race in Monza for reckless driving that resulted in the retirements of numerous drivers, including his teammate Johnny Cecotto Jr.

Racing record

Career summary

Complete Formula Renault 3.5 Series results
(key) (Races in bold indicate pole position) (Races in italics indicate fastest lap)

† Driver did not finish the race, but was classified as he completed more than 90% of the race distance.

Complete GP2 Series results
(key) (Races in bold indicate pole position) (Races in italics indicate fastest lap)

Complete FIA Formula 2 Championship results
(key) (Races in bold indicate pole position) (Races in italics indicate points for the fastest lap of top ten finishers)

Notes

References

External links

 Career details from Driver Database

1986 births
Living people
Spanish racing drivers
Sportspeople from Madrid
Euroformula Open Championship drivers
World Series Formula V8 3.5 drivers
GP2 Series drivers
FIA Formula 2 Championship drivers
Team Lazarus drivers
Caterham Racing drivers
Trident Racing drivers
MP Motorsport drivers
Carlin racing drivers
Rapax Team drivers
Hilmer Motorsport drivers
BVM Target drivers
De Villota Motorsport drivers
Racing drivers from Barcelona